Dumari (Taraiya, Saran, Bihar)  is a village in Taraiya Block of Saran district in Bihar, India. Located in a rural area of Saran district, it is one of the 79 villages of Taraiya Block. The village has 321 homes.

Geography
Dumari is a medium size village which is situated in the northernmost part of the Saran (Chhapra) district with the distance of about 39 km and about 77 km. far from its State Capital, Patna. It is in north-east direction of Taraiya Block (Police Station) with a distance of about 3 km. A famous temple of Lord Shiva(Shiv Mandir) and BhramBaba (Made by Late Ramadhar Singh) in Dumari Village. The nearest major road at the distance of less than 1 km is Sohagara-Nainijor-Guthani Road. Nearest river to this village on East side at a distance of about 3 km is Gandak river.

Demographics

According to Census 2011, Dumari's population is 1724. Out of this, 903 are males whereas the females count 821 here. This village has 270 kids in the age bracket of 0–6 years. Among them 155 are boys and 115 are girls.

Employment, culture, society and its people

The local languages are Bhojpuri and Hindi as well. There are people of various castes like Rajput, Baitha(Dhobi), shav etc. Despite such a great diversity, there is a common thread linking the people of this village because the 'fraternity and brotherhood' among these people are perfect. This shows 'Unity in Diversity'. There are some temples of Hindu deities like Goddesses Maa Kali and Chanki, Lord Hanuman and Lord Shiva. This village is known for Farmers. The number of employed people of Dumari village is more than 150 working in Private sectors including their own businesses and also working in Indian and Foreign companies as well.

Nearest railway stations and towns
Tha nearest railway station is shamkouriya and Mashrakh railway station.

Chhapra is the nearest towns.

External links
 saran.bih.nic.in

Villages in Saran district